The 1959 Pau Grand Prix was a Formula Two motor race held on 18 May 1959 at the Pau circuit, in Pau, Pyrénées-Atlantiques, France. The Grand Prix was won by Maurice Trintignant for the second year in a row, driving the Cooper T51. Bruce McLaren finished second and Lucien Bianchi third.

Classification

Race

References

Pau Grand Prix
1959 in French motorsport